'Keswick Codlin' is an apple cultivar that is considered excellent for cooking, but does not keep well in storage.

References

Apple cultivars